WPNN (790 AM) is a commercial radio station in Pensacola, Florida.  It broadcasts a talk radio format and is owned by Miracle Radio.  It calls itself "Pensacola's Talk and Local Sports Leader."  The radio studios and transmitter are on North Pace Boulevard at Kelly Avenue in Pensacola.

By day, WPNN transmits with 1,000 watts using a non-directional antenna, but at night, to avoid interference with other stations on 790 AM, it reduces power to only 66 watts.  Programming is also heard on 250-watt FM translator W279CY at 103.7 MHz.  

Most of WPNN's schedule is from nationally syndicated programs.  Weekdays on WPNN begin with "This Morning, America's First News with Gordon Deal."  That's followed by Glenn Beck, Dana Loesch, Sebastian Gorka, Joe Pags, Jesse Kelly, Michael Berry and "Coast to Coast AM with George Noory."  Weekends feature specialty shows on money, health, religion, travel, veterans, guns and real estate.  Weekend shows include "Bill Handel on the Law" and "Our American Stories with Lee Habeeb."  Most hours begin with CBS Radio News.  WPNN also carries New Orleans Pelicans basketball games and some local high school sports.

History
The original call sign was WPFA, standing for Pensacola, FloridA.  Owner J. William O'Connor received a construction permit from the Federal Communications Commission (FCC) in 1955 for a new station at 790 kilocycles.  O'Connor also had a construction permit to construct television station WPFA-TV.

It was a daytimer, powered at 1,000 watts but required to go off the air at sunset. WPFA was a rare radio station in that era to have a female program director, Barbara Holt. O'Connor sold the station in 1958 to Edwin H. Estes but remained as the general manager.

For most of the 1960s, 70s and 80s, WPNN had a country music format.  In 1990, the station switched its call letters to WSWL.  As music listening moved to the FM dial, WSWL tried an all news radio format, largely provided by CNN Headline News, though it also would simulcast newscasts from WEAR-TV on weeknights. In 2002, it changed its call sign to WPNN and later switched to an all-talk format.

In February 2016 the station acquired a move-in FM translator from Carrabelle, Florida, as part of the AM Revitalization project approved by the FCC.  It began transmitting on 103.7 MHz (W279CY) in early April 2016. (Taken from Alabama Broadcast Media Page)

References

External links

News and talk radio stations in the United States
PNN
Radio stations established in 1956
1956 establishments in Florida